Yoon Si-Ho (Hangul: 윤시호; born 12 May 1984) is a South Korean footballer who plays as full back for Gyeongju Korea Hydro & Nuclear Power FC. He was named Yoon Hong-Chang (Hangul: 윤홍창, Hanja: 尹洪唱) but was later renamed Yoon Si-Ho.

Club career 
On 25 February 2011, Yoon moved to Daegu FC. Yoon made his Daegu FC debut on 5 March against Gwangju FC at Gwangju World Cup Stadium in a 2–3 loss. After a one-year stint with Daegu, he returned to FC Seoul.

References

External links 

1984 births
Living people
South Korean footballers
K League 1 players
FC Seoul players
Korean Police FC (Semi-professional) players
Daegu FC players
Jeonnam Dragons players
Korea National League players
Association football defenders